"No Distance Left to Run" is a song by English rock band Blur from their sixth studio album, 13 (1999). It was released as the third and final single from the album on 15 November 1999, reaching number 14 on the UK Singles Chart. It is widely understood to refer to Blur vocalist Damon Albarn's split from long-term partner Justine Frischmann.

Music and lyrics
Damon Albarn says that he is affected by this song: "It upsets me, that song. It upset me singing it. Doing that vocal upset me greatly. To sing that lyric I really had to accept that that was the end of something in my life. It's amazing when you do have the guts to do that with your work, because it don't half help you." The name of the song is also the title of a documentary about the band, which was released in cinemas in January 2010.

Music video
The promotional video directed by Thomas Vinterberg is notable for using night-vision cameras to capture all four members of the band asleep in their respective beds.  A DVD version was also released that featured a short documentary about the making of the video. Alex James reportedly dreamt that he "was in Germany in a karaoke bar. I think I was a leopard for a minute."

B-sides
The B-side "Beagle 2", was sent aboard Beagle 2, an unsuccessful British landing spacecraft that formed part of the European Space Agency's 2003 Mars Express mission. The DVD edition of the single features a video of footage of the Beagle 2 over which plays "Far Out (Beagle 2 remix)", a full band version of a song originally from Parklife, using an outtake from the Parklife sessions.

Track listing 
CD1
 "No Distance Left To Run" – 3:28
 "Tender" (Cornelius remix) – 5:23
 "So You" – 4:14

Enhanced CD2
 "No Distance Left To Run" – 3:28
 "Battle" (UNKLE remix) – 7:15
 "Beagle 2" – 2:52
 "No Distance Left To Run" (video)

Cassette / Promo CD
 "No Distance Left To Run" – 3:28
 "Tender" (Cornelius remix) – 5:23

12" vinyl
 "No Distance Left To Run" – 3:28
 "Tender" (Cornelius remix) – 5:23
 "Battle" (UNKLE remix) – 7:15

DVD
 "No Distance Left To Run" (promotional video)
 "No Distance Left To Run" (live video)
 The Making Of No Distance Left To Run
 "Tender" (live video)
 "Battle" (live video)
 Beagle 2 (Space Footage) ("Far Out (Beagle 2 Remix)" soundtracks the space footage)

European CD
 "No Distance Left To Run" – 3:28
 "Tender" (Cornelius remix) – 5:23
 "Battle" (UNKLE remix) – 7:15
 "Beagle 2" – 2:52

Production credits 
"No Distance Left To Run" produced by William Orbit
"So You" and "Beagle 2" produced by Blur
Damon Albarn: Lead Vocals, Keyboards
Graham Coxon: Guitar, Backing Vocals
Alex James: Bass Guitar
Dave Rowntree: Drums

Charts

References

 

Blur (band) songs
1998 songs
1999 singles
Food Records singles
Songs based on actual events
Songs written by Alex James (musician)
Songs written by Damon Albarn
Songs written by Dave Rowntree
Songs written by Graham Coxon